Mongolian National Modern Art Gallery is a government-supported art gallery in Ulaanbaatar. It exhibits Mongolian modern art. There are about 4200 pieces in the museum's permanent collection, with only 7-8% being on display. The museum is constantly collecting new pieces. In addition, the museum also organizes temporary exhibitions and also shows them aboard.

History 
The gallery separated from the Fine Arts Museum of Mongolia in 1991. In 2020, 17 paintings were transferred here from the Winter Palace of the Bogd Khan, where they had been kept since 1986. Prior to 1986, the 17 works were located at the Fine Arts Zanabazar Museum.

References

Museums in Mongolia
Buildings and structures in Ulaanbaatar
Museums established in 1991
Art museums and galleries in Mongolia